Agüedo Point is the point forming the north extremity of Greenwich Island in the South Shetland Islands, Antarctica and the west side of the entrance to Guayaquil Bay.
Skaptopara Cove.

Location

Maps
 L.L. Ivanov et al. Antarctica: Livingston Island and Greenwich Island, South Shetland Islands. Scale 1:100000 topographic map. Sofia: Antarctic Place-names Commission of Bulgaria, 2005.

Notes

References
 SCAR Composite Antarctic Gazetteer.

Headlands of Greenwich Island